Bali International Convention Center or BICC is a convention center located in Nusa Dua, Bali, Indonesia. Since its inauguration, many important national and international conference, exhibition, fair, indoor sports and musical concerts were held at BICC including the 2007 United Nations Climate Change Conference, Miss World 2013, 2021 BWF World Tour Finals, and the 2022 G20 summit.

References

External links

Buildings and structures in Bali
Convention centres in Indonesia
Music venues in Indonesia
Bali